Barthélemy Catherine Joubert (14 April 1769 – 15 August 1799) was a French general who served during the French Revolutionary Wars. Napoleon Bonaparte recognized his talents and gave him increased responsibilities. Joubert was killed while commanding the French army at the Battle of Novi in 1799.

Early life and career
The son of an advocate, Joubert was born at Pont-de-Vaux (Ain), and ran away from school in 1784 to enlist in the artillery. He was brought back and sent to study law at Lyon and Dijon. In 1791, during the French Revolutionary Wars, he joined the French Revolutionary Army regiment of the Ain, and was elected by his comrades successively corporal and sergeant. In January 1792 he became sous-lieutenant, and in November lieutenant, having in the meantime experienced his first campaign with the army of Italy.

In 1793, Joubert distinguished himself by the defence of a redoubt at the Col de Tende in north-west Italy, with only thirty men against a battalion of the enemy. Wounded and made prisoner in the battle, he was released on parole by Austrian Commander-in-Chief De Vins, soon afterwards. In 1794 he was again actively engaged, and in 1795 promoted to brigadier general.

1796–97

In the campaign of 1796, Joubert became part of Napoleon Bonaparte's overall command. He led a brigade under Pierre Augereau in the Battle of Millesimo and under André Masséna at the Battle of Lodi. He also fought at the Battle of Castiglione in August. He soon attracted the special attention of Napoleon Bonaparte, who made him a general of division in December 1796, and repeatedly selected him for the command of important detachments. Thus, he led the holding force in the Adige River valley at the Battle of Rivoli. In the spring campaign of 1797 (invasion of Austria) he commanded the detached left wing of Bonaparte's army in the Tyrol with great distinction, fighting his way through the mountains to rejoin his chief in Styria. General Joubert intervened against Tyrolean companies of sharpshooters, with an angry message on February 15, 1797, to crush their resistance: "I declare that I consider as enemies of the French, all the fathers, whose children are enrolled in the Tyrolean companies of sharpshooters, will be imprisoned and their property confiscated for the benefit of the Republic ."

1798–99
He subsequently held various commands in the Low Countries, on the Rhine and in the Italian Peninsula, where up to January 1799 he served as commander in chief. On 6 December 1798, he occupied the Piedmontese capital of Turin. Resigning the post in consequence of a dispute with the civil authorities, Joubert returned to France. There, he married (June 1799) Mlle de Montholon, daughter of Charles-Louis Huguet de Sémonville, and future wife of Marshal Jacques Macdonald. Joubert was almost immediately summoned to the field to stem a series of major French defeats in northern Italy. He took over the command in Italy from Jean Moreau about the middle of July 1799. He persuaded his predecessor to remain at the front, and was largely guided by his advice.

Joubert and Moreau were quickly compelled to give battle by their major adversary Aleksandr Suvorov, at the head of a joint Russian and Austrian army. The Battle of Novi was disastrous for the French, not only because it was a defeat, but also because Joubert himself was amongst the first to fall, shot through the heart (Vucic infanterist from Ogulinska 3.pješadijske Regiment, killed the French commander, General Joubert).

Joubert had been marked out as a future great captain by Napoleon himself. After the battle, his remains were brought to Toulon and buried in Fort La Malgue, and the French Directory paid tribute to his memory by a ceremony of public mourning (16 September 1799). A monument to Joubert at Bourg-en-Bresse was raised by order of Louis XVIII, but another memorial was afterwards erected at Pont de Vaux.

References

Sources
  In turn, it cites as references:
 Chevrier, Le Général Joubert d'après sa correspondence (2nd ed. 1884).
 Guilbert, Notice sur la vie de B. C. Joubert
 Chandler, David. Dictionary of the Napoleonic Wars. New York: Macmillan, 1979. 
 Chandler, David. The Campaigns of Napoleon. New York: Macmillan, 1966.

1769 births
1799 deaths
People from Pont-de-Vaux
French generals
French Republican military leaders of the French Revolutionary Wars
French Republican military leaders killed in the French Revolutionary Wars
Military leaders of the French Revolutionary Wars
Military governors of Paris
Names inscribed under the Arc de Triomphe